The Fondazione Academia Montis Regalis is an Italian cultural foundation promoting baroque and classical orchestral training based in the town of Mondovì since 1992. In 1994 it was recognised as a non-profit organisation Organizzazione non lucrative di utilità sociale (Onlus) by the Piedmont Region.

The orchestra has been directed by conductors including Luigi Mangiocavallo and the current principal director Alessandro De Marchi.

References

External links
Website

Italian orchestras